Gold iodide is the chemical compound with the formula . Although  is predicted to be stable, gold(III) iodide remains an example of a nonexistent or unstable compound. Attempts to isolate pure samples result in the formation of gold(I) iodide and iodine:

References

Gold(III) compounds
Iodides
Metal halides
Gold–halogen compounds
Hypothetical chemical compounds